"Going Back to My Roots" is a 1977 song by Lamont Dozier. Cover versions by Odyssey, FPI Project, and Linda Clifford have entered the UK Singles Chart, with the FPI Project's version charting in other European markets as well.

Originally an album track discussing genealogy, the song was written for the African-American market and touches on the matters of self-identity, family, and soul fulfillment. It has appeared on assorted compilation albums.

Background
The song was written and first recorded by Lamont Dozier for his 1977 LP Peddlin' Music on the Side. It was produced by Stewart Levine and features additional production from Hugh Masekela and Rik Pekkonen.

Cover versions

Richie Havens
An early cover version was recorded by Richie Havens in 1980. Unusually for folk musician Havens, it incorporated disco influences; this version was later sampled in FPI Project's version of the song and in "Destiny and Tenacity" on The Kleptones' 2010 album Uptime / Downtime.

Odyssey

The New York City disco group Odyssey released a cover version of this song in 1981. It charted at #4 on the UK Singles Chart, spending six weeks in the top ten and another six on the chart. It also graced the US Billboard R&B Singles at #68.  In South Africa, "Going Back to My Roots" reached #1.

This version of the song appears on the Ashes to Ashes: Series 2 Original Soundtrack and was also danced to by Patsy Palmer and Anton du Beke on the third series of Strictly Come Dancing.

Charts

FPI Project

Another cover version was released by FPI Project, a trio consisting of Marco Fratty, Corrado Presti, and Roberto Intrallazzi who, according to John Bush, of AllMusic introduced Italo house to the world in the early 1990s. Two versions of the song were released; one featuring the vocals of Sharon D. Clarke, the other of Paolo Dini. Both versions sample Richie Havens' version of the song, as well as T99's "Too Nice to Be Real", Honesty 69's "Rich in Paradise", and the Yeah! Woo! drumbeat.

They took the tune first to #9 on the UK Singles Chart in 1989 whilst backed with "Rich In Paradise", and in 1999 to #96 in its own right. It also charted at #5 on the German Singles Chart, #5 on the Austrian Singles Chart and #10 on the Swiss Singles Chart.

The song appears on the compilation album Deep Heat 5 – Feed the Fever.

Track listings

Original release

7": EMI / 06 2037567 (Italy)

 "Going Back to My Roots" – 4:10
 "Salsa in Paradise" – 4:00

7": On the Beat / OTB 1385-0 (France)

 "Going Back to My Roots" – 4:10
 "Rich in Paradise" – 3:35

7": On the Beat / OTB 1385-7 (France)

 "Going Back to My Roots" – 4:02
 "Rich in Paradise" – 3:35

7": ZYX / ZYX 6256-7 (Germany)

 "Going Back to My Roots" – 3:40
 "Rich in Paradise" – 3:38

7": Rumour / RUMA 9 (UK)

 "Going Back to My Roots"
 "Rich in Paradise"

7": Rumour / RUMAS 9 (UK)

 "Going Back to My Roots" (vocal remix)
 "Rich in Paradise"

12": Paradise Project / MIX 001 (Italy)

 "Going Back to My Roots" – 5:48
 "Rich in Paradise" – 5:28
 "Piano in Paradise" – 1:42

12": Paradise Project / MIX 002 (Italy)

 "Going Back to My Roots" (vocal version) – 5:50
 "Rich in Paradise" (original version) – 5:28
 "Piano in Paradise" (original version) – 1:42
 "Going Back to My Roots" (remix version) – 5:05
 "Salsa in Paradise" (Bum Bum version) – 5:00
 "Going Back to My Roots" (Pianoappella version) – 3:15

12": On the Beat / OTB 1385-6 (France)

 "Going Back to My Roots" (club mix) – 5:30
 "Going Back to My Roots" – 3:40
 "Rich in Paradise" (club mix) – 5:30
 "Rich in Paradise" (single version) – 3:36

12" & CD: ZYX / ZYX 6256-12 (Germany)

 "Going Back to My Roots" – 5:25
 "Rich in Paradise" – 5:25
 "Piano Paradise" – 1:40

12" & CD: ZYX / ZYX 6256R-12 (Germany)

 "Going Back to My Roots" (remix version) – 5:05
 "Salsa in Paradise" (Bum Bum version) – 5:00
 "Going Back to My Roots" (Pianoappella version) – 3:15

12" & CD: ZYX / ZYX 6290-12 (Germany)

 "Going Back to My Roots" (vocal mix) – 5:50
 "Rich in Paradise" (original version) – 5:30
 "Going Back to My Roots" (Pianoappella) – 3:15

12" Rumour / RUMAT 9 (UK)

 "Going Back to My Roots" – 5:30
 "Rich in Paradise" – 5:30
 "Piano Paradise" – 1:38

12": Rumour / RUMAX 9 (UK)

 "Going Back to My Roots" (vocal remix)
 "Rich in Paradise" (original version)
 "Going Back to My Roots" (remix)
 "Salsa in Paradise" (Boom Boom version)

Later releases

12": 99 North / 99 NTH 17 (UK, 1999)

 "Rich in Paradise / Going Back to My Roots" (DnD classic vocal mix) – 6:45
 "Rich in Paradise / Going Back to My Roots" (Philter's Good Time mix) – 6:46
 "Rich in Paradise / Going Back to My Roots" (Loop Da Loop's full vocal mix) – 5:16

12": 99 North / 99 NTH 17R (UK, 1999)

 "Rich in Paradise / Going Back to My Roots" (The Phantom`s Big Bash mix) – 6:44
 "Rich in Paradise / Going Back to My Roots" (DnD Bonus Dubb) – 5:40
 "Rich in Paradise / Going Back to My Roots" (original FPI mix) – 5:50

CD: 99 North / CD NTH 17 (UK, 1999)

 "Rich in Paradise / Going Back to My Roots" (DnD classic radio mix) – 3:30
 "Rich in Paradise / Going Back to My Roots" (Java remix) – 7:56
 "Rich in Paradise / Going Back to My Roots" (original FPI mix) – 5:50

12": Simple Vinyl / S12DJ096 (UK, 2003)

 "Going Back to My Roots" (original vocal mix) – 5:50
 "Rich in Paradise" (original mix) – 5:30
 "Piano in Paradise" (bonus mix) – 1:40

12": Simple Vinyl / S12DJ096 (UK, 2005)

 "Going Back to My Roots" (original vocal mix) – 5:50
 "Rich in Paradise" (original mix) – 5:26
 "Going Back to My Roots" (LuvDup remix) – 8:03
 "Going Back to My Roots" (Hannu remix) – 6:22

12": J / JV 003 (Italy, 2005)

 "Going Back to My Roots" (extended rmx 2005) – 6:23
 "Going Back to My Roots" (original rmx 2005) – 4:38
 "Rich in Paradise" (original mix) – 4:35

Digital: In the Music / ITM 061 (Italy, 2014)

 "Rich in Paradise (Going Back to My Roots)" (vocal remix) – 5:51
 "Rich in Paradise (Going Back to My Roots)" (Pianoappella) – 3:16
 "Rich in Paradise (Going Back to My Roots)" (vocal dance remix) – 5:08
 "Rich in Paradise (Going Back to My Roots)" – 5:27
 "Rich in Paradise" – 5:27
 "Salsa in Paradise" – 5:00
 "Rich in Paradise (Going Back to My Roots)" (instrumental dance mix) – 4:47
 "Rich in Paradise (Going Back to My Roots)" (instrumental remix) – 5:07
 "Piano in Paradise" – 1:40

Digital: Snatch! / SNATCH114 (UK, 2018)

 "Rich in Paradise (Going Back to My Roots)" (Soul Speech remix) – 8:37
 "Rich in Paradise (Going Back to My Roots)" (Soul Speech dub mix) – 6:39

Digital: Just Entertainment / JD 1085 (Italy, 2018)

 "Rich in Paradise (Going Back to My Roots)" (Flashmob 2018 dub remix) – 6:29
 "Rich in Paradise (Going Back to My Roots)" (Flashmob 2018 vocal remix) – 5:25

Charts

Linda Clifford cover
The song charted for a single week at #85 in 2002 when covered by Linda Clifford and was featured on Wendy Matthews' 1992 album Lily.

References

1977 songs
Songs written by Lamont Dozier
Odyssey (band) songs
1981 singles
Number-one singles in South Africa